James David Storm (born February 5, 1971) is an American former professional ice hockey player.

Early life 
Storm was born in Milford, Michigan. As a youth, he played in the 1984 Quebec International Pee-Wee Hockey Tournament with the Detroit Little Caesars minor ice hockey team.

Career 
Storm played 84 games in the National Hockey League for the Dallas Stars and Hartford Whalers.

Career statistics

Regular season and playoffs

International

References

External links 
 

1971 births
Living people
American men's ice hockey left wingers
Dallas Stars players
Hartford Whalers draft picks
Hartford Whalers players
Ice hockey players from Michigan
Kalamazoo Wings (1974–2000) players
Michigan Tech Huskies men's ice hockey players
People from Milford, Michigan
Springfield Falcons players
Utah Grizzlies (IHL) players